Madureira is a Portuguese surname. Notable people with the surname include:

Augusto Madureira (born 1967), Portuguese journalist and songwriter
Doka Madureira (born 1984), Brazilian footballer
Joe Madureira (born 1974), American comics writer and artist
Jorge Madureira (born 1976), Portuguese footballer
Marcelo Madureira (born 1958), Brazilian comedian

Portuguese-language surnames